Loghman Pharmaceutical & Hygienic Co. (Shirkat-e Darvii-ye vâ Behedashiti-ye Laqman) is an Iranian pharmaceuticals company. The company engages in the discovery, development, manufacture, and marketing of health care solutions in Iran.

History
Loghmans was established in 1968 as I.D.I. Pharmaceuticals. In 1979, the company changed its name to Loghman and expanded its operations.

The company has been listed on the Tehran Stock Exchange since 1997.

products

Acetaminophen+Codeine
Amoxicillin
Azithromycin
Buspirone
Carbamazepine
Cefalexin
Cefazolin
Cefepime
Cefixime
Ceftazidime
Ceftriaxone
Cefuroxime
Cefalexin
Diazepam
Erythromycin
Fluconazole
Sodium Fluoride
Ibuprofen
Indomethacin
Lorazepam
Losartan Potassium
Meropenem
Methimazole
Nortriptyline
Phenytoin
Sodium Fluoride
Sorbitol
Valsartan

Development plan 
Insulin

See also
Health care in Iran

References

External links
 

Companies listed on the Tehran Stock Exchange
Pharmaceutical companies of Iran
Pharmaceutical companies established in 1968
Iranian brands
Iranian companies established in 1968